Gergely Krausz (born 25 December 1993) is a Hungarian badminton player affiliated with Multi Alarm SE. He competed at the 2015 and 2019 European Games. Krausz is the first ever Hungarian men's singles player to participate at the Olympics by competing at the 2020 Tokyo Games. He retired from the international badminton on 17 October 2021.

Achievements

BWF International Challenge/Series (2 titles, 3 runners-up) 
Men's singles

Men's doubles

  BWF International Challenge tournament
  BWF International Series tournament
  BWF Future Series tournament

References

External links 
 

Living people
1993 births
People from Mór
Hungarian male badminton players
Badminton players at the 2020 Summer Olympics
Olympic badminton players of Hungary
Badminton players at the 2015 European Games
Badminton players at the 2019 European Games
European Games competitors for Hungary
Sportspeople from Fejér County